Heather Maureen Ward (later Heather Nielsen; born 1938) is a former English badminton player who won international championships and competed at an elite level during a two decade span from the mid-1950s to the mid-1970s.

Biography
Noted for her grace and athleticism, she won women's doubles with American Margaret Varner at the 1958 All England Badminton Championships (then the world's most prestigious tournament for individual competitors). The following year Ward interrupted the reign of the great Judy Devlin (Hashman) by defeating her in the 1959 All England Badminton Championships women's singles final. During the 1960s her badminton career was hampered by a variety of factors including athletic injury, marriage and motherhood, and residence in South Africa. In 1970, however, she returned to the 1970 All England Badminton Championships to reach the final of women's singles before bowing to Japan's Etsuko Takenaka. Continuing to compete, she was an All-England singles quarter-finalist as late as 1975.

She married Egon Nielsen and they had four children Bjorn, Gorm, Belinda and Anders Nielsen.

References

English female badminton players
1938 births
Living people